George Dorobanţu (born October 14, 1974) is a Romanian filmmaker. He made his directorial debut with Elevator (2008), an indie production adapting Gabriel Pintilei's stage play of the same title. Aside from being a director, he is also working for the advertising industry.

Films 
Dorobanţu's first Elevator has been notable due to the claim that it was made with a fund of 300 euro. Despite the shoestring budget, it earned several rewards both in Romania and overseas. Elevator was followed by Bucharestless, which was a cinéma verité or a documentary about the Romanian capital. The 2011 film had an outside-the-box cinematic perspective, with a sequential narrative approach, and no dialogues. It depicted the soul of the city, which was referred to in the past as "Little Paris".
The post-apocalyptic film called Omega Rose followed Bucharestless, although it was only completed in 2018. This movie was already in post-production stage in 2012. During the same year, Suspense 101 was also completed and it earned immense interest. The 17-minute short film, which told the story of a hacker, who invented an odd prototype, was selected as one of the finalists of the annual ScripTeast, which were presented at the 2012 Cannes Film Festival.

References

External links 
 
 

Romanian film directors
People from Constanța
1974 births
Living people